is a Japanese sport shooter who competed in the 1988 Summer Olympics.

References

1944 births
Living people
Japanese male sport shooters
Skeet shooters
Olympic shooters of Japan
Shooters at the 1988 Summer Olympics
Shooters at the 1986 Asian Games
Asian Games medalists in shooting
Asian Games bronze medalists for Japan
Medalists at the 1986 Asian Games
20th-century Japanese people
21st-century Japanese people